Dazecuo (also known as Dagze Lake) is one of many inland lakes in Tibet. It is a salt lake on the Tibetan Plateau in Xainza County within Nagqu in the Tibet Autonomous Region of China. It was reported in 2021 that the lake receives "good environmental protection".

It has an area of 260 km² (100 square miles) and an elevation of 4,459 meters above sea level. In 2021 the lake was 21.1 kilometers in length and 16.9 kilometers wide.

In glacial times, the region was considerably wetter, and lakes were correspondingly much larger. Changes in climate have resulted in greater aridity on the Tibetan Plateau. The numerous concentric rings that circle the lake are fossil shorelines, and attest to the historical presence of a larger, deeper lake.

See also
 Bangecuo
 Gomang Co
 Lake Urru
 Namtso
 Siling Lake
 List of lakes of China

References

Further reading

External links
 "Ali North Line, these lakes are waiting for you to check in". Inf.news.

Lakes of Tibet
Xainza County
Saline lakes of Asia